A Piscine Tournesol or Sunflower Pool is a type of pool built in France on an industrial scale in the late 1970s and early 1980s.

183 pools were built as a result of the French government's "Operation 1,000 pools" program.

Background 

"Operation 1,000 pools" was launched in 1969 and led by Joseph Comiti, the Secretary of State for Youth, Sports, and Leisure.

The purpose of the program was to promote swimming on a national level following disappointing results at the 1968 Summer Olympics and two accidents in 1969 that resulted in the deaths of 43 children.

Between 600 and 700 pools were built in 5 styles (Iris, Sky, Sun, Duck, and Sunflower). The Sunflower style edged out the others, winning two design competitions.

The Sunflower pool was the design of architect Bernard Schoeller, with Thémis Constantinidis as engineer, and the Matra company providing materials.

Out of the 250 Sunflower pools that were planned, 183 were built.

Characteristics 

There were two designs: one for 25 m pools and another for 50 m pools.

The roofs were 6 m tall and opened 120° hence the sunflower name, which, weather permitting,  allowed the pools to function as semi-outdoor pools particularly in summer.

Installations 

A prototype was built in 1972 in the French commune of Nangis.

The national government dictated the design of the pools but local authorities ran and operated the pools.

Sunflower pools were some of the world's first large-scale prefabricated structures.  Most Sunflower pools have since been renovated, adapted, or torn down.

Several Sunflower pools achieved heritage status in the twenty-first century including:

 the Bonneveine pool in Marseille (2000);
 the pool in Carros-le-Neuf (2005); and
 the pool in Biscarrosse in 2012.

List of Sunflower pools 

This is a list of 171 of the sunflower pools built, of which 100 remain.

In addition to the 183 pools in France, 3 were thought to have been built in Luxembourg (of which one remains), 1 in Belgium and 1 in Saudi Arabia.

Legacy 

A model Sunflower pool is featured at the Architecture and Heritage City Museum in Paris.

A photo by  Aurore Valade of the Sunflower Pool in Beauvais  was published in 2008 in the photo book Plein air.

References

Additional reading 

 
 
 Patrick Facon, « Les piscines Tournesol », dans 
 
 

Swimming venues in France